The 23rd Rifle Division was an infantry division of the Red Army and Soviet Army, formed three times.

It was formed in July 1922 in the Ukrainian Soviet Socialist Republic, inheriting the Order of the Red Banner from the predecessor Zavolzhskaya Rifle Brigade. On 23 May 1932 the division was awarded the Order of Lenin for helping to construct the Kharkov Tractor Factory.  On 1 March 1943 it became the 71st Guards Rifle Division for its actions in the Battle of Stalingrad.

The division was reformed on 2 May 1943 on the bаsе of the 7th Rifle and 76th Naval Infantry Brigades in the Steppe Military District. The division was awarded the Order of the Red Banner, the Order of Suvorov 2nd class, and the Order of Kutuzov 2nd class for its actions. The division also received the honorifics "Kiev" and "Zhitomir". The division was disbanded "in place" by Stavka Directive No. 11095 of 29 May 1945, creating the Group of Soviet Forces in Germany.

It was reformed in 1955 by redesignation of the 198th Rifle Division at Biysk. On 25 June 1957 the 95th Motor Rifle Division was formed in Biysk, Altay Kray, Siberian Military District, from the 23rd Rifle Division. It was disbanded on 1 March 1959.

Notes

References

023
Military units and formations established in 1922
Military units and formations disestablished in 1957